St. Monica's School may refer to:

Australia
St Monica's High School Administration Building, a heritage-listed school building in Cairns, Queensland

St Monica's Parish School, Walkerville, South Australia

Canada
St.Monica Elementary/Jr.High (Calgary)

United Kingdom
St Monica's High School, Prestwich, Greater Manchester

United States 
Saint Monica Catholic High School, Los Angeles, California